= Vehicle registration plates of the Maldives =

Republic of the Maldives
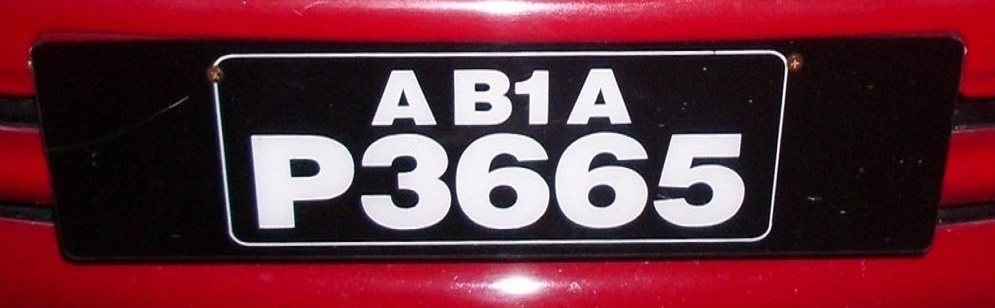
- Maldivian regular legal standard number plate. Current format since 2003.
- Country: Maldives
- Country code: None

Current series
- Serial format: AXXBC1234
- Colour (front): White on black
- Colour (rear): White on black

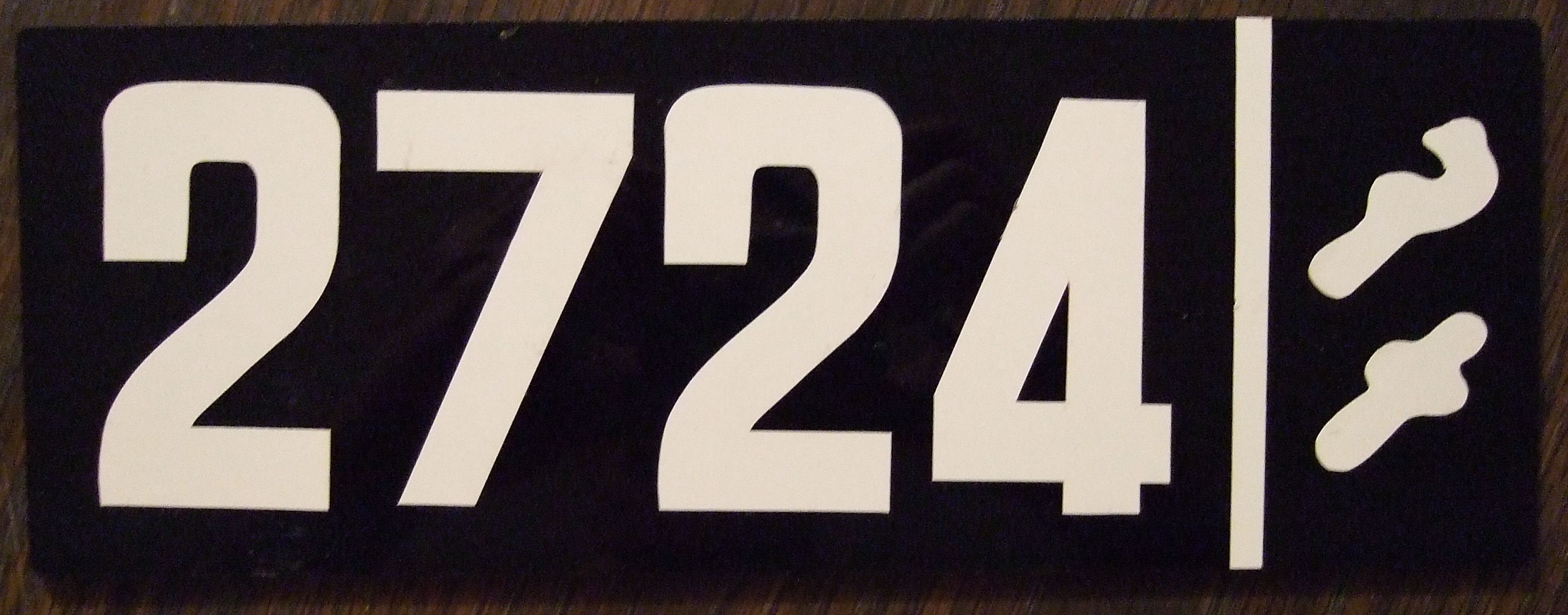
1984 Maldivian license plate

The Maldives requires its residents to register their motor vehicles and display vehicle registration plates.

Maldivian license plates always had white font on a black base. Until 1984, they showed a number with up to four digits.

In 1984 an additional graphic was placed behind the number and in 1998 letters were added to the numbers.

The current system was introduced in 2003. Background colour, in combination with the first letter on the left denotes the type of vehicle.

Colour	Prefix
	P = Private, C = Commercial, G = Government S = Police
	T = Taxi
	D = Diplomatic

== System ==
Vehicle Category	Serial letters	Serial number
A1 = Motorcycle, 50cc / invalid carriages. A0 = Motorcycle, 50cc and above. B1 = Light passenger vehicles, seating capacity 9 or less. B2 = Heavy passenger vehicles, seating capacity 10 to 20. B0 = Heavy passenger vehicles, seating above 20. C1 = Light goods vehicles, up to 2 tons. C2 = Medium goods vehicles, more than 2 tons -4 tons. C0 = Heavy goods vehicles, above 4 tons.		
